Charles Nelson (born October 28, 1995) is a gridiron football wide receiver and return specialist for the Edmonton Elks of the CFL. He played college football at Oregon, where he earned all-conference honors as a return specialist in 2014 and 2015.

College career 
At Oregon, Nelson was one of the program's most versatile players, splitting time at wide receiver, cornerback, and returning kicks and punts.

Professional career 
After going undrafted in the 2018 NFL Draft, Nelson had tryouts with the Kansas City Chiefs and Indianapolis Colts but did not sign with them.

Winnipeg Blue Bombers  
Nelson signed with the Winnipeg Blue Bombers as a free agent on May 25, 2018, and retired a week later. He returned to the Blue Bombers in September, joining their practice roster for five games before playing in the season finale against Edmonton. Nelson played in four games in 2019 before suffering a season-ending foot injury. He still earned his first Grey Cup when Winnipeg won the 107th Grey Cup.

Nelson signed a two-year contract extension with the Blue Bombers in 2021. Nelson was moved to the practice roster, and eventually released at the end of the season.

Edmonton Elks
On February 5, 2022, the Edmonton Elks announced the signing of Nelson.

References

External links 
 Winnipeg Blue Bombers profile
 Oregon profile

1995 births
Living people
Sportspeople from Daytona Beach, Florida
Players of American football from Florida
American football wide receivers
American football return specialists
American football cornerbacks
Canadian football wide receivers
Canadian football return specialists
Oregon Ducks football players
University of Oregon alumni
Winnipeg Blue Bombers players
American players of Canadian football